Segment 3 is an experimental theatre and film production company based in Montreal, Canada, which has been active since early 2013.
It was founded by Dominik Pagacz, a Canadian artist known mostly for his sound work on motion pictures.

Theatro/Filmography 
 2013 Segment 3
 2013 3hams
 2013 Avec leur tact habituel
 2013 3orthographies
 2013 Like molten lead
 2013 Their simple needs
 2013 A hole in the desert
 2013 To sleep
 2013 Rawdon
 2013 Faustus: incident #375
 2013 goodboy
 2013 Arabstrap
 2013 Sir, replies Monsieur
 2013 3rôles
 2014 Quand il vous regarde
 2014 Mercitronc!
 2014 All the King's Horses
 2015 Funestes oisances

References

External links 
 Official website

Theatre companies in Quebec
Companies based in Montreal
Film production companies of Canada
Canadian companies established in 2013
Theatre in Montreal